Ronald Mawson (16 September 1914 – 1981) was an English football goalkeeper who played for Crewe Alexandra and Wrexham in the late 1940s.

Career
Mawson played for RAF Ternhill during the war, and also guested for Port Vale in 1945. He was still a young man at the war's end and so signed with Frank Hill's Crewe Alexandra in 1946. He made 23 Third Division North appearances for the "Railwaymen" in 1946–47 and 1947–48. He left Gresty Road, and moved on to Wrexham in 1948, but made only six appearances at Racecourse Ground in the 1948–49 campaign.

Career statistics
Source:

References

1941 births
1981 deaths
Sportspeople from Bishop Auckland
Footballers from County Durham
English footballers
Association football goalkeepers
Port Vale F.C. wartime guest players
Crewe Alexandra F.C. players
Wrexham A.F.C. players
English Football League players